Haitian French (Haitian Creole: fransè ayisyen) is the variety of French spoken in Haiti. Haitian French is close to standard French. It should be distinguished from Haitian Creole.

Phonology 

The phoneme consonant // is pronounced [], but it is often silent in the syllable coda when occurring before a consonant or prosodic break (faire is pronounced [ː]). The nasal vowels are not pronounced as in French of France, // → [], // → [], // → [], and // → []. The typical vowel shifts make it sound very much like other regional accents of the French Caribbean and the Francophone countries of Africa. The perceivable difference between Haitian French and the French spoken in Paris lies in the Haitian speaker's intonation, where a subtle creole-based tone carrying the French on top is found. Importantly, these differences are not enough to create a misunderstanding between a native Parisian speaker and a speaker of Haitian French.

In Haiti, the French spoken in Paris is very influential, so much so that a growing number of Haitians would rather speak it as precisely as possible and pursue this by listening to Radio France Internationale and matching the somewhat conservative style of speech heard on that station.

In the educated groups, French is spoken more closely to the Parisian accent. It is within this group that a major portion of enrollment is provided for the private schools and universities. Even in this group however, a native accent of the language usually occurs in everyone's speech.

See also

 Canadian French
 Louisiana French
 Saint-Barthélemy French
 Varieties of French
 French language in the United States

References

Further reading

External links 
 Muska Group: Native Haitian French & Haitian Creole Advertisements (Film & Radio)
 Accents: A Manual for Actors, Volume 1
 Haiti French vs. Paris French (A linguistic comparison)
 Listen to French accents across the world (Videos)

Languages of Haiti
French dialects
French language in the Americas